Red Stone Creek is a stream in Jackson County in the U.S. state of South Dakota.

Red Stone Creek received its name on account of the reddish soil along the watercourse.

See also
List of rivers of South Dakota

References

Rivers of Jackson County, South Dakota
Rivers of South Dakota